Deneb was a  cargo ship that was built in 1923 as Rhenania by Nüscke & Co, Stettin for German owners. She was sold in 1924 and renamed Marth Halm In 1927, she was sold to Finnish owners and renamed Bore VII. She ran aground in 1936 and was declared a total loss. In 1937, she was sold to Germany, repaired and renamed Götaälv. In 1938 she was sold and renamed Bernhard Schulte. In 1941, she sank off the Lofoten Islands but was salvaged and repaired.

Bernhard Schulte was seized by the Allies at Flensburg, Germany in May 1945, passed to the Ministry of War Transport (MoWT) and renamed Empire Congo. In 1947, she was sold into merchant service and renamed Coquetside. In 1951, she was sold to Italy and renamed Deneb. She served until 1966 when she was scrapped at La Spezia, Italy.

Description
The ship was built in 1923 by Nüscke & Co, Stettin.

She had a GRT of 1,080 and a NRT of 654. She had a DWT of 1,700

The engine was built by A Borsig GmbH, Berlin.

History
Rhenania was built for Westdeutsche Schiffahrts AG, Düsseldorf. On 11 January 1924, she ran aground at Korsør, Denmark. She was refloated on 14 January. At some point in 1924, she was sold to E Halm & Co, Köln and renamed Marth Halm. She was operated by Kölner Reederei AG. In 1926, she was sold to Ångfartyg Ab Bore, Turku, Finland and renamed Bore VII. She was placed under the management of Thr. Kramer. Her port of registry was Åbo. Bore VII was allocated the Code Letters THFJ and the Finnish Official Number 981. In 1934, her Code Letters were changed to OHGQ. On 18 December 1936, Bore VII ran aground off Kotka, Finland and was declared a total loss.

In 1937, the wreck was sold to August Bolten Wm. Miller's Nachfolger, Hamburg. The ship was repaired and renamed Götaälv. She was allocated the Code Letters DJTY. In 1938, she was sold to Schulte & Bruns, Emden and renamed Bernhard Schulte. She was salvaged and repaired. In May 1945, Bernhard Schulte was seized by the Allies at Flensburg, Germany. She was passed to the MoWT and renamed Empire Congo.

Empire Congo was placed under the management of Monroe Bros Ltd. Her port of registry was changed to London. She was allocated the Code Letters GKRQ and the United Kingdom Official Number 180607. In 1947, she was sold to Coquet Shipping Co, Newcastle upon Tyne and renamed Coquetside. She was operated under the management of Anthony & Bainbridge Ltd. In 1951, Coquetside was sold to C Cosulich, Sicily, Italy and renamed Deneb. She was sold in 1958 to Nautica SpA, Sardinia, Italy. Deneb served until October 1966, when she was scrapped at La Spezia, Italy.

References

External links
Photo of Bore VII

1923 ships
Ships built in Stettin
Steamships of Germany
Merchant ships of Germany
Maritime incidents in 1924
Steamships of Finland
Merchant ships of Finland
Maritime incidents in 1936
World War II merchant ships of Germany
Maritime incidents in March 1941
Ministry of War Transport ships
Empire ships
Steamships of the United Kingdom
Merchant ships of the United Kingdom
Steamships of Italy
Merchant ships of Italy